"Switch Up" is a song by American R&B singer R. Kelly. It was released on August 21, 2015 as the second single of his thirteenth studio album, The Buffet. The single features guest appearances by American rapper Lil Wayne and singer Jeremih.

Track listing 
Download digital
Switch Up (Explicit) (featuring Lil Wayne and Jeremih) — 3:23

Charts

Weekly charts

References

External links

R. Kelly songs
Lil Wayne songs
Jeremih songs
2015 songs
2015 singles
RCA Records singles
Songs written by R. Kelly
Songs written by Lil Wayne
Song recordings produced by R. Kelly
Songs written by Jeremih
Songs written by Starrah